China–Mali relations refer to the bilateral relations between China and Mali. The People's Republic of China established diplomatic relations with the Republic of Mali on October 25, 1960.

Chinese development finance to Mali
From 2000 to 2012, there were approximately 20 Chinese official development finance projects identified in Mali through various media reports. These projects range from loans worth Fr75 billion ($154 million) on preferential rates from China to build the Bamako-Ségou highway in 2010, to a $51.5 million grant to construct the 'Third Bridge' for Mali in Bamako in 2007.

See also
 Foreign relations of China
 Foreign relations of Mali

References

 
Mali
Bilateral relations of Mali